Veronika E. Hubeny is an American physicist and academic who specialises in string theory and quantum gravity. Since 2015, she has been a professor in the Department of Physics of University of California, Davis. Previously, Hubeny was Professor of Physics at Durham University, where she had worked from 2005 to 2015. From January to April 2014, she was a member of the Institute for Advanced Study in Princeton, New Jersey. In 2019, she was selected as a fellow of the International Society on General Relativity and Gravitation.

Selected works

References

American string theorists
American women physicists
Physics educators
21st-century American physicists
University of Maryland, College Park alumni
Academics of Durham University
University of California, Davis faculty
Institute for Advanced Study visiting scholars
University of California, Santa Barbara alumni
American women academics
Living people
Year of birth missing (living people)
 Quantum physicists
 Quantum gravity physicists
 21st-century American women scientists